Étienne Fiacre Louis Raoul (23 July 1815 – 30 March 1852) was a French naval surgeon and naturalist.

He was born in Brest, the son of Joseph-François Raoul, a captain in the French Navy, and studied at the medical school in Brest. He was appointed surgeon, third class, in 1836. He took part in an expedition on the ship L'Aube under the command of Lieutenant Lavaud. He landed at the Bay of Islands in New Zealand on 11 July 1840, and departed three years later aboard L'Allier.

After returning to Paris, he worked at the Muséum national d'histoire naturelle (National Museum of Natural History) under the direction of Adolphe Brongniart (1801–1876) and Joseph Decaisne (1807–1882) to describe and classify the large number of specimens collected during his stay in New Zealand. At the same time, he studied medicine and obtained his doctorate in 1844 with the thesis Des rapports des maladies aigües et chroniques du cœur avec les affections dites rhumatismales ("Reports of acute and chronic coronary diseases with rheumatic ailments").

In 1846 he published a book Choix de plantes de la Nouvelle-Zélande ("Selected plants of New Zealand"). After a short expedition to Africa in 1846, he became medical professor at the port of Brest in 1849. In 1851 he published Guide hygiénique et médical pour les bâtiments de commerce qui fréquentent la Côte Occidentale d’Afrique ("Sanitary and medical guide for merchant vessels visiting the West Coast of Africa").

In the 'jardin des explorateurs' at Brest, his place of death is given as Lannilis.

The genus Raoulia was named after him by Joseph Dalton Hooker.

References

19th-century French botanists
1815 births
1852 deaths
Naval surgeons